Presidential elections were held in Peru in 1899. Eduardo López de Romaña of the Civilista Party was elected with 97% of the vote.

Results

References

Presidential elections in Peru
Peru
1899 in Peru